Issus-Aussaguel Station is a radio antenna station for communication with spacecraft operated by the Centre National d'Études Spatiales (CNES). It is located 20 km South of Toulouse, France.

External links
Serving History- Issus Aussaguel

CNES
Space program of France